Riksundar Banerjee or Riksundar Bandyopadhyay (Bengali: ঋকসুন্দর ব্যানার্জী), (born on 9 August 1987) is a fiction writer from Kolkata, West Bengal, India.

Education 
He earned an post graduate degree (M.A.) in Bengali Literature from Jadavpur University.

He has been awarded Ph.D at The University of Burdwan on Uncanny in Bengali Literature: Traditions and Evolution (Bengali: "বাংলা গল্প সাহিত্যে ভূত: পরম্পরা ও পরিবর্তমানতা " ) in 2018.

He has jointly presented the paper on 'The Algorithm Of Ghostliness' at York 2019, Bond University, July 2019

Writings 
He has been writing articles in several magazines and news papers, such as Anandabazar Patrika and Ei Samay.

Among his other works there is the movie Stuck and a discussion on effects of AI and supernaturals on humans, "Stuck Discussion", held in Triguna Sen Auditorium, Jadavpur University. He is also one of the co-writers of the screenplay and dialogues for the film Bhotbhoti (Whispers of Mermaids).

Riksundar's book 'The Book of Indian Ghosts' received praise in a published review on 'The Hindu' newspaper.

Published books 
 Trainer Adda: Bangaleer Bhinno Sangskritik Porisor, 2014.
 Chhayashorir: Sekal Ekaler Bhooter Golpo, 2016. 
 Probase Doiber Boshe, 2017.
 Cholar Pother Khorkuto, 2019.
 The Book of Indian Ghosts, 2021, from Aleph.
 Haunted Places of India, 2023 (upcoming) from Aleph

Published Articles 

 The ghost who loved: Tinkle of anklets from the corridors of Calcutta High Court - The Telegraph India (Published on 26th March 2022)
 Ghost story: The spirit denizens of Kamalpur Zamindarbari - The Telegraph India (Published on 25th April 2022)
 Clip-clop, Clip-clop… there comes Warren Hastings’ ghost at his Alipore house  - The Telegraph India (Published on 9th April 2022)
 West Side (spook) Story: Halloween and the western ghosts  - The Telegraph India (Published on 31st October 2022)

References 

1987 births
Bengali writers
Living people
Writers from Kolkata
University of Burdwan alumni
Jadavpur University alumni